Nina Oyama is an Australian comedian, writer, actor, and director. She is best known for her role as Courtney in the ABC comedy series Utopia.

Early life
Oyama was born to an Australian mother from Sydney's Northern Beaches and a Japanese father. Her parents met at a hostel in Nagoya. Oyama attended North Sydney Girls High School, and went on to study communications and theatre media at Charles Sturt University in Bathurst, New South Wales.

Career
Oyama began performing stand-up comedy at 17 years old. In 2012, she was a state finalist in the Class Clowns competition. That year she also performed at The Sydney Fringe as part of "Barely Legal - Australia's Best Young Comedians" alongside Neel Kolhatkar and Aaron Chen, and performed on Dan Ilic's FBi Radio show. Oyama became a writer for the children's sketch comedy show You're Skitting Me, and made her television debut performing stand-up comedy on SBS 2 in 2014.

In 2017, Oyama was cast as executive assistant/receptionist Courtney Kano in the third and fourth season of Utopia (Australian TV series). In the same year, she joined the cast of ABC Comedy's topical entertainment show Tonightly with Tom Ballard as a writer; she also starred in the second and final series of the show in 2018.

Oyama directed, co-wrote, and co-starred in The Angus Project, a web series and television pilot that aired on ABC iview in 2018. Based on real events in Bathurst, the series co-stars Angus Thompson as a sports journalist with cerebral palsy, for whom Oyama becomes a friend and caregiver. The show received praise for its earnest depictions of disability and regional Australia; the pilot was nominated for an Australian Directors' Guild award. Oyama also co-directed Diving In, which starred an amputee swimmer and was featured in the 2020 Sydney Film Festival.

Oyama regularly performs stand-up comedy, and has been nominated for Best Newcomer at the Melbourne International Comedy Festival. She stars on the Network 10 sketch comedy series Kinne Tonight, and served as a scriptwriter for Michael Cusack's Adult Swim series YOLO: Crystal Fantasy. Oyama also received media attention in 2020 for making "#CatPoop" a trending topic on Twitter in Australia.

References

External links

Australian people of Japanese descent
Australian television writers
Australian women television writers
Australian women comedians
Living people
1993 births